Changsha (Ch’ang-sha) is the capital of China's Hunan province.

Changsha may also refer to:
 Changsha County, a local county
 Changsha dialect, the local dialect of the Xiang language family
 "Changsha" (poem), a 1925 poem by Mao Zedong
 Changsha (ship) (2020), a multi-purpose cargo ship owned and operated by the Swire Shipping, a division of China Navigation Company 
 Changsha Kingdom, a state during the Han Dynasty of China.
 Changsha Island, a former island in the Yangtze estuary now joined to Chongming
 Changsha Village, Huangqi, Lianjiang County, Fuzhou, Fujian, China

See also
 Changshu, in Jiangsu
 Chinese destroyer Changsha (173)